Alan Moore (born 25 November 1974) is a retired Irish footballer.

Club career
Moore moved to Derry City after a short spell without a club, as he had left Shelbourne in January 2007 when his contract was up.

His previous clubs included Burnley, Barnsley and Middlesbrough. During his time at Middlesbrough, he was once described as "the Ryan Giggs of the north-east".

Moore returned home to Ireland during the summer of 2004 and signed for Shelbourne where he had an immediate impact on the team. In the UEFA Champions League qualifiers he scored away to KR Reykjavik to help secure a 2–2 draw that would see the team progress on away goals and in the Second Round he scored both home and away against Hajduk Split who Shelbourne knocked out 4–3 on aggregate. Shelbourne were eventually knocked out by Deportivo La Coruña in the last round before the group stages.

By the end of 2004, Moore had helped Shelbourne retain the League of Ireland Premier Division title for the first time. In 2006, Moore won another League of Ireland championship medal as the Dublin side pipped Derry City to the title on goal difference.

Despite this, however, on 5 March 2007, Moore signed for Derry City to work with his former manager, Pat Fenlon once again.

However, he failed to settle at Derry City and he signed for Sligo Rovers in February 2008  In July 2008 Moore, retired from the game after failing to recover from a back injury. In October 2008 he joined Jim Crawford as assistant caretaker manager at Shamrock Rovers.

Moore recently swapped being the Youth Team manager at Carlisle United FC to become a coach at Preston's Cardinal Newman College.

International career
Moore played at every age group for his national team and won 8 senior caps for the Republic of Ireland.

Honours
 Football league winner- 1994-95
 Football league runners up 1997-98
 League cup runners up 1997
League of Ireland: 2
 Shelbourne – 2004, 2006

References

External links

http://oceanfm.ie/onair/sligoleitrimsport.php?articleid=000001900

Republic of Ireland association footballers
Republic of Ireland international footballers
Republic of Ireland youth international footballers
1974 births
Middlesbrough F.C. players
Barnsley F.C. players
Burnley F.C. players
Shelbourne F.C. players
Living people
Premier League players
Derry City F.C. players
Sligo Rovers F.C. players
League of Ireland players
Bury F.C. non-playing staff
Carlisle United F.C. non-playing staff
Association football midfielders
Rivermount Boys F.C. players